Molanna is a genus of hood casemakers in the family Molannidae. There are more than 20 described species in Molanna.

Species
These 27 species belong to the genus Molanna:

 Molanna albicans (Zetterstedt, 1840)
 Molanna angustata Curtis, 1834
 Molanna blenda Sibley, 1926
 Molanna byssa
 Molanna cinerea Hagen, 1861
 Molanna crinita Wiggins, 1968
 Molanna cupripennis Ulmer, 1906
 Molanna derosa Cockerell
 Molanna flavicornis Banks, 1914
 Molanna jolandae Neboiss, 1993
 Molanna kunmingensis Hwang, 1957
 Molanna moesta Banks, 1906
 Molanna nervosa Ulmer, 1927
 Molanna nigra (Zetterstedt, 1840)
 Molanna oglamar Malicky & Chantaramongkol, 1989
 Molanna paramoesta Wiggins, 1968
 Molanna saetigera Wiggins, 1968
 Molanna submarginalis McLachlan, 1872
 Molanna taprobane Flint, 1973
 Molanna tryphena Betten, 1934
 Molanna ulmerina Navás, 1934
 Molanna uniophila Vorhies, 1909
 Molanna walgrena Milne, 1934
 Molanna xiaguana Malicky, 1994
 † Molanna crassicornis Ulmer, 1912
 † Molanna megategulae Wichard, 2013
 † Molanna okraina Ivanov & Melnitsky, 2013

References

Further reading

External links

 

Trichoptera genera
Articles created by Qbugbot
Integripalpia